Elodie Picard (born 8 September 1997) is a field hockey player from Belgium, who plays as a goalkeeper.

Career

Club hockey
In the Belgian Hockey League, Picard plays club hockey for Royal Antwerp HC.

National teams

Under–18
In 2015, Elodie Picard was a member of the Belgium U–18 team at the EuroHockey Youth Championship in Santander.

Under–21
Picard won her first medal with Belgium in 2017 as a member of the Under–21 side. She represented the team at the EuroHockey Junior Championship in Valencia. The team finished second, taking home a silver medal.

Red Panthers
Elodie Picard made her debut for the Belgium 'Red Panthers' in 2018 during a test series against Argentina in Buenos Aires.

In 2019 she was a member of the national squad for the inaugural tournament of the FIH Pro League. Later that year in August she represented the team at the EuroHockey Nations Championship in Antwerp. In December, Picard was named in the Belgium squad for the 2020 calendar year.

References

External links
 
 

1997 births
Living people
Female field hockey goalkeepers
Belgian female field hockey players